Major fall 2008 fashion weeks were held in New York City, London, Paris, and Milan during February and March 2008.


New York Fashion Week

The Fall 2008 New York Fashion Week, officially called Mercedes-Benz Fashion Week, was held between February 1 and February 8, 2008.

Participating designers
This list includes shows on the official schedule(note [a]) and those reviewed at style.com(note [b]).

London Fashion Week

Source: official fashion week schedule.

Paris Fashion Week

Source: Official fashion week schedule. Some dates to be confirmed.

Los Angeles Fashion Week
Fall '08 collections are shown from March 7 - March 14

Designs featured

Mercedes-Benz Fashion Week at Smashbox Studios

THE GREEN INITIATIVE Humanitarian Fashion Show
 Lilikoi Clothing by Barbara Boswell
 Vintage China by Deacon Yu and Andrew Wong
 Lady Muse by Mathilde
 Andira Rain Tees by Beth Doane
 M the Movement by Michael "M" Hererra
 Rene Geneva Design by Rene Geneva

Source: fashionweekla.com calendar

LA Fashion Week 2008 controversy 
In 2008, there were numerous celebrity fashion designers showcasing their designs at LA's Fashion Week. Many people believed that, because of this new surge of "celebs-as-trendsetters", some fashion regulars and legitimate designers did not attend the 2008 fashion event. Instead, attendees turned their attention to the designs of "The Hills" star Lauren Conrad, who debuted her collection during the week, Nicky Hilton, and The Pussycat Dolls.

Sue Wong was one of the designers that openly voiced her opinion about celebrity designers. Wong calls the emerging trend "absolutely bogus." Wong is usually a regular at the Mercedes-Benz LA Fashion Week, but decided not to show in 2008, claiming she wanted to concentrate on doing something "different."
"Sure, every celebrity and his brother wants to be a fashion designer", said Wong, who has been designing since 1968. "It's not like anybody can pick it up and do it. It's a science. You need to know fit and construction." Wong has also claimed that the celebrities are just capitalizing on their "15 minutes of fame." Normally, up-and-coming designers would not get the kind of exposures celebrities get for their clothing lines.

Lauren Conrad has tried to defend herself against the criticisms and pressures put on her before her fashion launch. Conrad, who has trained at the Fashion Institute of Design and Merchandising in Los Angeles, said the additional pressure thrust upon her Fashion Week debut made her nervous while working on the line. She described it as "California chic", basing this season on a recent trip to Paris reflected in simple, clean pieces accessorized with berets, netting, leather gloves, bows and lace."I will probably never have the respect I want in the fashion industry, but I can work hard every day to try and prove myself", Conrad said. "Can I really be criticized for taking advantage on an opportunity that allows me to have what I've always wanted?"

Wong still voiced her skepticism. "Let's see whether she can survive and thrive. It takes so much dedication", she said. "You gotta really pay your dues to be a serious artist." A review by Jenny Peters of Fashion Wire Daily criticized her debut line, writing, "There was absolutely nothing new or innovative in her collection."

References

Fashion weeks
2000s fashion
2008 in fashion